Laurel Kessel (born February 7, 1954) is a former volleyball player. She played for San Diego's Crawford High School, San Diego State, and the United States national team. She appeared in the 1988 Summer Olympics.

References

1954 births
Living people
Olympic volleyball players of the United States
Volleyball players at the 1988 Summer Olympics
American women's volleyball players
21st-century American women
San Diego State Aztecs women's volleyball players
Pan American Games medalists in volleyball
Pan American Games bronze medalists for the United States
Medalists at the 1987 Pan American Games